Edwin P. "Ed" Hedley (July 23, 1864 in Philadelphia, Pennsylvania – May 22, 1947 in Philadelphia, Pennsylvania) was an American rower who competed in the 1900 Summer Olympics. He was a member of the American crew of the Vesper Boat Club, which won the gold medal in the men's eight.

References

External links
 
 

1864 births
1947 deaths
Rowers from Philadelphia
Rowers at the 1900 Summer Olympics
Olympic gold medalists for the United States in rowing
American male rowers
Medalists at the 1900 Summer Olympics